Catherine of Foix may refer to:

 Catherine of Navarre, queen of Navarre, duchess of Gandía, duchess of Montblanc, duchess of Peñafiel, countess of Foix
 Infanta Catherine of Navarre countess of Candale and countess of Benauges